Dhanyala is a village and union council of Jhelum District in the Punjab Province of Pakistan. Dhanyal is one of the largest tribes living in the Potohar plateau and Lower Himalayas for the last eight centuries. This tribe traces its lineage to Ali Ibne Talib. In Dhanyala there is a hospital named Mian Muhammad Bukhsh Hospital.

Education 
Dhanyala is very prominent village of District Jhelum. People of Dhanyala are very educated and include officers in the Pakistan Army, police, and officers in the government and private sector. A lot of Dhanyalians are settled abroad. Dhanyala village is located 4 kilometers away from GT Road. In Dhanyala there are many schools for boys and girls. The Govt. Girls Higher Secondary School was initially established by Mian Muhammad Bukhsh Trust – MMBT and then handed over to the education department. Following are the schools working in Dhanyala:
 Govt. Elementary school for boys, Dhanyala.
 Govt. Higher secondary school for girls, Dhanyala.
 Govt. Primary school for boys, Dhanyala.

The Board of Trustees – BOT of Mian Muhammad Bakhsh Trust also established a hospital in the name of the great Sufi Mian Muhammad Bukhsh, which provide fee medical services to the local community and community of 12 more Union Councils. Ch. Mushtaq Hussain Bargatt is serving the trust as Chairperson. For further information please visit: www.bukhsh.org.

References 

Populated places in Tehsil Jhelum
Union councils of Jhelum Tehsil